The 2009 Giro del Trentino was the 33rd edition of the Tour of the Alps cycle race and was held on 22 April to 25 April 2009. The race started in Torbole and finished in Pejo Fonti. The race was won by Ivan Basso.

General classification

References

2009
2009 in road cycling
2009 in Italian sport